Andy Roddick was the defending champion and won in the final 7–6(11–9), 6–3 against Pete Sampras.

Seeds
A champion seed is indicated in bold text while text in italics indicates the round in which that seed was eliminated.

  Tommy Haas (second round)
  Andre Agassi (semifinals)
  Andy Roddick (champion)
  Pete Sampras (final)
  James Blake (quarterfinals)
  Wayne Ferreira (first round)
  Todd Martin (quarterfinals)
  Jan-Michael Gambill (first round)

Draw

External links
 2002 U.S. Men's Clay Court Championships Draw

2002 Singles
Singles